Oleg Aleksandrovich Strizhenov (born 10 August 1929 in Blagoveshchensk) is a Soviet and Russian stage and film actor. People's Artist of the USSR (1988).

Life and career
Strizhenov completed the B. V. Shchukin Higher Theater School in 1953 and from 1953 he was actor in the Russian Theater of Drama in Tallinn (in Estonia); from 1954 to 1955, he acted at the Pushkin Theater in Leningrad, and in 1957 he was at the Screen Actors Theater and Studio in Moscow. From 1966 to 1976 he acted at the Moscow Artists' and Actors' Theater.

Oleg's older brother, Gleb, was also an actor who was an Honored Artist of the RSFSR. Oleg is the father of the Russian actor, writer, producer, and director Aleksandr Strizhenov (husband of actress Yekaterina Strizhenova).

Awards
 Medal "For Valiant Labour in the Great Patriotic War 1941–1945" (1945)
 Honored Artist of the RSFSR (1964)
 People's Artist of the RSFSR (1969)
 People's Artist of the USSR (1988)
 Order "For Merit to the Fatherland";
 3rd class (30 July 1999) – For outstanding contribution to the development of national cinema
 2nd class (19 October 2004) – For outstanding achievements in the field of cinema and many years of creative activity
 Golden Eagle Award (2010)
 Jubilee Medal "In Commemoration of the 100th Anniversary of the Birth of Vladimir Ilyich Lenin"
 Jubilee Medal "Thirty Years of Victory in the Great Patriotic War 1941–1945"
 Jubilee Medal "Forty Years of Victory in the Great Patriotic War 1941–1945"
 Jubilee Medal "50 Years of Victory in the Great Patriotic War 1941–1945"
 Jubilee Medal "60 Years of Victory in the Great Patriotic War 1941–1945"
 Jubilee Medal "65 Years of Victory in the Great Patriotic War 1941–1945"
 Jubilee Medal "70 Years of Victory in the Great Patriotic War 1941–1945"
 Medal "Veteran of Labour"
 Medal "In Commemoration of the 800th Anniversary of Moscow"
 Medal "In Commemoration of the 850th Anniversary of Moscow"

Filmography
 Sporting Honour (1951)
 The Gadfly (1955)
 The Mexican (1955)
 The Forty-First (1956)
 Pardesi (1957)
 Life in Your Hands (1958)
 The Captain's Daughter (1958)
 The Queen of Spades (1960)
 Northern Story (1960)
 Optimistic Tragedy (1963)
 His Name Was Robert (1967)
 Not Under the Jurisdiction (1969)
 The Captivating Star of Happiness (1975)
 Start Liquidation (1983)

External links
 
“Oleg Strizhenov. Love of all life. " Documentary

References

1929 births
20th-century Russian male actors
21st-century Russian male actors
Living people
People from Blagoveshchensk
Academicians of the National Academy of Motion Picture Arts and Sciences of Russia
Honored Artists of the RSFSR
People's Artists of the RSFSR
People's Artists of the USSR
Recipients of the Order "For Merit to the Fatherland", 2nd class
Recipients of the Order "For Merit to the Fatherland", 3rd class
Russian male film actors
Russian male stage actors
Russian male television actors
Russian male voice actors
Soviet male film actors
Soviet male stage actors
Soviet male television actors
Soviet male voice actors